"Be Real" is a song by American hip hop recording artist Kid Ink. The song was released on March 31, 2015, by Tha Alumni Music Group, 88 Classic and RCA Records, as the third single from his third studio album Full Speed (2015). The track was produced by frequent collaborator DJ Mustard, J Gramm and Twice as Nice and features a hook by Dej Loaf.

Music video
The music video for "Be Real" was directed by Mike Ho, and filmed in a church. On March 12, 2015, MTV released an exclusive behind-the-scenes video from the filmings. The music video was released on March 31, 2015.

Charts

Weekly charts

Year-end charts

Certifications

References

2015 singles
2015 songs
Kid Ink songs
Dej Loaf songs
RCA Records singles
Song recordings produced by Mustard (record producer)
Songs written by Mustard (record producer)
Songs written by Kid Ink
Songs written by Starrah
Songs written by Dej Loaf